Herbert Samuel Barker (23 June 1929 – 17 May 2006) was an all-around athlete who represented Australia in the hammer throw at the Empire Games and in rugby union as a Wallaby, and played for New South Wales in Basketball.

Early life
Barker was born in Sydney and was one of four children. His father died when he 14 and he was introduced to a wide variety of sports by Ray Rosbrook, the supervisor of the Moore Park sports centre. He played rugby league at Bourke Street Public School before playing in a Kentwell Cup winning team for Moore Park.

Sporting career
Barker played basketball in the NSW team from 1946 until 1956. In the 1950 British Empire Games he represented Australia as a hammer thrower and won a bronze medal. He won the Australian hammer throw championship in 1956 weighing just over 70 kg. In 1952 he made his first grade debut as a centre with Randwick District Rugby Union Football Club and very soon went into the NSW and Australian sides. He played in internationals against Fiji, New Zealand and South Africa - eight tests in all. He was plagued by injury in 1955 and 1956 and in 1957 he moved to the St George District Rugby League Club. His league career ended in 1959.

Coaching & teaching career
In 1966, Barker became a physical education teacher at Newington College and coached athletics, basketball and rugby union. He retired in 1994

References

1929 births
2006 deaths
Australian male hammer throwers
Athletes (track and field) at the 1950 British Empire Games
Commonwealth Games bronze medallists for Australia
Commonwealth Games medallists in athletics
Australian rugby union players
Rugby union centres
Staff of Newington College
Australia international rugby union players
Rugby union players from Sydney
Medallists at the 1950 British Empire Games